The women's rhythmic team competition at the 2006 Asian Games in Doha, Qatar was held on 9 December 2006 at the Aspire Hall 2.

Schedule
All times are Arabia Standard Time (UTC+03:00)

Results

References

Results

External links
Official website

Rhythmic Women Team